Casimir Zeglen (Polish: Kazimierz Żegleń; 1869 near Tarnopol – before 1927) was a Polish priest who invented a silk bulletproof vest. At the age of 18 he entered the Resurrectionist Order in Lwów (today Lviv, Ukraine). In 1890, he moved to the United States.

In 1893, after the assassination of Carter Harrison Sr., the mayor of Chicago, he worked on an improved silk bulletproof vest. In 1897, he worked on it with Jan Szczepanik. It saved the life of Alfonso XIII, the King of Spain—his carriage was covered with Szczepanik's bulletproof armour when a bomb exploded near it.

He was a Catholic priest of St. Stanislaus Kostka Roman Catholic Church in Chicago, then the largest Polish church in the country, with 40,000 in the parish. In his early twenties, he began experimenting with the cloth, using steel shavings, moss, and hair. In his research, he came upon the work of Dr. George E. Goodfellow, who had written about the bullet-resistive properties of silk. In his mid-thirties he discovered a way to weave the silk, to enable it to capture the bullet, while visiting weaving mills in Vienna, Austria and Aachen, Germany.

See also
 List of Poles
 Timeline of Polish science and technology

References

"Three Grades of Fabric", Brooklyn Eagle, 9 October 1902
 Łotysz, Sławomir. "Mnich wynalazca" (Monk-inventor). Polonia (Chicago) Vol. 13, No. 1-2 (2007)  pp. 68–71, and Vol. 14, No. 3-4 (2007) pp. 64–67.
 Articles in Nowy Dziennik (a Polish Daily News) published in New York City): Kuloodporny ksiądz (Bulletproof priest), 5 May 2006; Polski ksiądz i Polski Edison (A Polish priest and the Polish Edison), 13 May 2006; Od habitu do opony (From a Religious habit to a tire), 20 May 2006.

External links
 The Monk Who Stopped Bullets with Silk: Inventing the Bulletproof Vest, article from Culture.pl
 BULLETPROOF, podcast episode about Żegleń from Stories From The Eastern West

1869 births
American inventors
Austro-Hungarian emigrants to the United States
Year of death missing
American Roman Catholic priests
Polish Roman Catholic priests